M. D. Sridhar is a Kannada film writer and director. He debuted with the successful 2002 film Friends and since then has directed many successful films such as Chellata (2006), Porki (2010) and Bulbul (2013).

Personal life

M.D. Sridhar was born in Bunt (Shetty) family of Bailoor village of Karkala Tq in Udupi district. Following his passion to work in films he migrated to Bengaluru. He married Vijayalakshmi in 1997.

Filmography

References

External links

Living people
Year of birth missing (living people)
Kannada film directors
Film directors from Karnataka
21st-century Indian film directors
Kannada screenwriters
Screenwriters from Karnataka